Massachusetts House of Representatives' 16th Essex district in the United States is one of 160 legislative districts included in the lower house of the Massachusetts General Court. It covers part of the city of Lawrence in Essex County. Democrat Francisco Paulino of Lawrence has represented the district since 2023.

The current district geographic boundary overlaps with that of the Massachusetts Senate's 2nd Essex and Middlesex district.

Representatives
 George H. Chase, circa 1858 
 Gustavus Attwill, circa 1859 
 Francis Boardman, circa 1888 
 James H. Richards, circa 1888 
 Raymond H. Trefry, circa 1920 
 Richard Lester Hull, circa 1951 
 David J. Swartz, circa 1975 
 Jose L. Santiago, 1999-2003
 William Lantigua, 2003-2010
 Marcos Devers, 2010–2017
 Juana Matias, 2017-2019
 Marcos Devers, 2019-2023
 Francisco Paulino, 2023-present

Former locales
The district previously covered: 
 part of Lynn, circa 1872
 Nahant, circa 1872

See also
 List of Massachusetts House of Representatives elections
 Other Essex County districts of the Massachusetts House of Representatives: 1st, 2nd, 3rd, 4th, 5th, 6th, 7th, 8th, 9th, 10th, 11th, 12th, 13th, 14th, 15th, 17th, 18th
 Essex County districts of the Massachusett Senate: 1st, 2nd, 3rd; 1st Essex and Middlesex; 2nd Essex and Middlesex
 List of Massachusetts General Courts
 List of former districts of the Massachusetts House of Representatives

Images

References

External links
 Ballotpedia
  (State House district information based on U.S. Census Bureau's American Community Survey).

House
Government of Essex County, Massachusetts